The Ukraine national under-18 football team is one of several junior national teams of the Football Federation of Ukraine. It serves as a reserve of under-19 team in preparation to continental under-19 football competitions. Until 2001 it served as the base team, before UEFA transitioned competitions to under-19 age requirements.

History

Head coaches
 1999-2002 Anatoliy Kroshchenko

European championship

In 2001 Ukraine U-18 qualified for the 2001 FIFA World Youth Championship.

Honours
Continental competitions (UEFA European Under-18 Football Championship):
 runners-up (1): 2000

Recent results

Current squad 
The following players have been called up for 2014 Slovakia Cup.

See also 
 Ukraine national football team
 Ukraine national under-21 football team
 Ukraine national under-19 football team

References 

European national under-18 association football teams
under-18
Youth football in Ukraine